WWPE-FM (92.1 MHz; "Sasquatch 92.1") is a radio station licensed to Hermantown, Minnesota, and serves the Twin Ports. Established in 1996, the station is owned by Townsquare Media, through licensee Townsquare Media Duluth License, LLC. It airs a classic rock format branded as "Sasquatch 92.1" (Sasquatch or Bigfoot is a mythical ape-like creature said to inhabit the northern woods of the U.S. and Canada).

The studios and offices are located in Downtown Duluth at 207 W. Superior St., Suite 130, Duluth, MN 55802, and the transmitter is located off South Blackman Avenue, in the Duluth antenna farm.

History
The station signed on in 1996 as WWAX, carrying a modern adult contemporary satellite feed. The call sign was similar to the WAKX call sign formerly used by WDUL and KTCO. A change to local programming was made in 1997. WWAX branded itself as "92.1 Kiss FM" until being warned by Clear Channel (now iHeartMedia) which holds the trademark for the "Kiss" moniker. The station changed its moniker to "92.1 The Beat" by 2004. It had fluctuated between the formats of modern AC, hot AC, top 40 (CHR) and adult CHR from 1997 to early 2007, and competed with KBMX "Mix 108".

92.1 The Beat tweaked its format to rhythmic leaning CHR in February 2007, and went adult contemporary as "92.1 Lite FM" on February 29, 2008.

In October 2008, announcements were already made on the station's webpage that "A 'Lite' Christmas was coming soon". By November 1 of that year, 92.1 Lite was playing all Christmas music around the clock. For 2009, the station started around the clock Christmas music during the middle of November instead of at the beginning.

On September 2, 2010, WWAX changed its format to hot adult contemporary, branded as "NU 92" (pronounced as "New 92"). This came just after 102.5 flipped from classic rock to top 40 (CHR) as KDWZ on August 30, with NU 92 and KDWZ both competing with KBMX on both sides of the pop music spectrum.

On March 2, 2015, WWAX changed its format to sports, branded as "92.1 The Fan". Much of its programming originated from the "Fan Radio Network", based at KFXN-FM in Minneapolis–St. Paul.

On April 19, 2017, Red Rock Radio announced that it would sell WWAX and KQDS to Twin Ports Radio for $200,000; through a time brokerage agreement, Twin Ports assumed control of the stations on May 1. Twin Ports' owner, Dan Hatfield, also ran Christian radio station WJRF; following the sale, WWAX and KQDS moved their studios to WJRF's facilities, but retained their sports formats. The sale was consummated on June 30, 2017.

On January 30, 2020, Townsquare Media announced that it would acquire WWAX; it assumed control of the station via local marketing agreement on February 1, at which point the classic rock format of WEBC began simulcasting on WWAX as "Sasquatch 92.1", with the sports talk format moving to WEBC as "Fan 106.5" on February 17. The $370,000 sale to Townsquare was completed on October 9; on October 20, the call sign was changed to WWPE-FM.

References

External links

Radio stations in Duluth, Minnesota
Classic rock radio stations in the United States
Radio stations established in 2001
2001 establishments in Minnesota
Townsquare Media radio stations